Agdistis insidiatrix is a moth in the family Pterophoridae. It is known from Yemen (Socotra) and Iran.

References

Agdistinae
Fauna of Socotra
Moths described in 1933